Zhou Weizhi (13 June 1916 – 12 September 2014) was a Chinese musician and politician. He served as acting Minister of Culture of the People's Republic of China, and was a standing committee member of the 7th Chinese People's Political Consultative Conference (CPPCC).

Biography
Zhou was born Zhou Liangji in Dongtai, Jiangsu, Republic of China on 13 June 1916, to a poor family, both his grandfather Zhou Songquan and father Zhou Weitang were farmers. Zhou has two uncles, Zhou Xinfu and Zhou Shaoqing. His father went to Shanghai as a worker in a factory when he at the age of 5, at the same time, he attended old-style private school and developed an interest in Chinese Opera. By the age of 9, Zhou attended middle school in 1925.

In 1926, Zhou's father took part in the Northern Expedition, he went to Shanghai and Shaoxing with his father. In 1930, Zhou worked in the library of the newspaper Shen Bao. After the January 28 Incident, Zhou worked as a secretary of Li Gongpu until 1934, he changed his name Zhou Weizhi in the same year.

From 1934 to 1937, Zhou worked in  the Shanghai Cultural of National Salvation Association. In September 1937, Zhou joined the Eighth Route Army in Linfen, Shanxi Province, and he joined the Communist Party of China in Xi'an in July 1938. From November 1938 to 1944, Zhou worked in the Shanxi-Chahar-Hebei Border Region. From April 1944 to 1949, Zhou worked as a teacher in Lu Xun Art Academy of Yan'an.

In 1966, the Cultural Revolution was launched by Mao Zedong, Zhou suffered political persecution. Zhou, his wife Wang Kun, and his children were sent to the May Seventh Cadre Schools to work.

From December 1977 to April 1982, Zhou served as vice minister of Culture of China. From December 1980 to April 1982, Zhou served as Minister of Culture. From December 1996 to November 2006, Zhou served as chairman of the China Federation of Literary and Art Circles. From November 2006 to 2011, Zhou served as honorary chairman of the China Federation of Literary and Art Circles.

Zhou died in Beijing on September 12, 2014.

Personal life
Zhou was married to the singer Wang Kun. They had two sons, Zhou Qi, and Zhou Yue.

Award
 May 2001, Chinese Music Golden Bell Awards

References

1916 births
Politicians from Yancheng
Ministers of Culture of the People's Republic of China
2014 deaths
Chinese Communist Party politicians from Jiangsu
People's Republic of China politicians from Jiangsu
People from Dongtai